David Paterson has served in several elected positions, including the New York State Senate and as Lieutenant Governor of New York.

As a running mate to Eliot Spitzer, Paterson scored a landslide victory in the 2006 election with 69% of the vote. It was the largest margin of victory in a gubernatorial race in New York history, and the second-largest for any statewide race in New York history. The only larger victory was Chuck Schumer's 71% victory in his successful reelection bid for the U.S. Senate two years earlier. Spitzer carried all but three counties in the state.

2006

2004

Mosley also ran on the Conservative line.

2002

Mosley also ran on the Conservative and Independence party lines.
Paterson also ran on the Liberal and Working Families party lines.

2000

Mosley also ran on the Reform Party line.
Paterson also ran on the Liberal and Working Families party lines.

1998

Paterson also ran on the Liberal party line.

1996

Paterson also ran on the Liberal party line.

1994

1993

 
 
 
 
 
 
 

Alter also held the Republican and Liberal party designations
Reale also held the Conservative party designation
Percentages from THE 1993 PRIMARY: Public Advocate; Green Scores Big Victory Over His Five Opponents in The New York Times on September 15, 1993

1992

1990

1988

Paterson also ran on the Liberal party line.

1986

 
 
 

Kirkland also held the Liberal Party designation.

1985

2010 Governor's Race Polling
In February 2010, then Governor David Paterson, announced he would not run for a full term in 2010.

Works
 Paterson, David Black, Blind, & In Charge: A Story of Visionary Leadership and Overcoming Adversity. New York, New York, 2020

Further reading
 John C. Walker,The Harlem Fox: J. Raymond Jones at Tammany 1920:1970, New York: State University New York Press, 1989.
 David N. Dinkins, A Mayor's Life: Governing New York's Gorgeous Mosaic, PublicAffairs Books, 2013
 Rangel, Charles B.; Wynter, Leon (2007). And I Haven't Had a Bad Day Since: From the Streets of Harlem to the Halls of Congress. New York: 
 Baker Motley, Constance Equal Justice Under The Law: An Autobiography, New York: Farrar, Straus, and Giroux, 1998.
 Howell, Ron Boss of Black Brooklyn: The Life and Times of Bertram L. Baker Fordham University Press Bronx, New York 2018

References

David Paterson
Paterson, David